Christopher Alan Nkunku (born 14 November 1997) is a French professional footballer who plays as a midfielder or forward for Bundesliga club RB Leipzig and the France national team.

Nkunku is a graduate of the Paris Saint-Germain Academy and made his professional debut for the club in December 2015. He made 78 appearances for them and won three Ligue 1 titles, the Coupe de France twice and the Coupe de la Ligue twice. Nkunku joined German side RB Leipzig in July 2019, with whom he won the Bundesliga Player of the Season award and the DFB-Pokal in the 2021–22 season.

Nkunku represented France at multiple youth international levels, before making his debut for the senior national team in March 2022.

Early life
Christopher Alan Nkunku was born on 14 November 1997 in Lagny-sur-Marne, Seine-et-Marne. He began playing football with AS Marolles as a six-year-old. In 2009, he joined Fontainebleau, where he was spotted by scouts of several professional clubs. Despite his young age and childlike physique, he was noted for "his speed, his technique and his vision of the game", as recalled by Norbert Boj in 2020, former head of the Fontainebleau football school. He would line up in all positions across the midfield, a versatility he, according to another coach at the club, owed to his "technical prowess, obviously, but especially his intelligence of play".

Due to being considered too young and light, Nkunku was not signed by Lens, Le Havre and Monaco; clubs where he had been on trials. He eventually signed with Paris Saint-Germain, where he was able to progress through the youth sides of INF Clairefontaine at U15-level. Spending the weekdays at Clairefontaine and playing only on weekends with Paris Saint-Germain, he made the permanent move to the French powerhouse at the age of fifteen.

Club career

Paris Saint-Germain
Nkunku joined the Paris Saint-Germain youth system in 2010. He was a member of the youth team who were runners-up in the 2015–16 UEFA Youth League. He made his professional debut at the age of 18 on 8 December 2015, in a UEFA Champions League match against Shakhtar Donetsk, replacing Lucas Moura after 87 minutes in a 2–0 home win. He scored his first professional goal in a 7–0 home win against Bastia in the Coupe de France on 7 January 2017. On 10 March 2018, he scored his first brace as a professional, in a 5–0 win against Metz.

RB Leipzig

On 18 July 2019, RB Leipzig announced Nkunku's signing on a five-year deal for an approximate €13 million transfer fee plus bonuses. He made his debut for the club on 11 August in a DFB-Pokal match against VfL Osnabrück, which ended in a 3–2 victory. His Bundesliga debut followed a week later, scoring his first competitive goal on the first matchday of the 2019–20 season in a 4–0 win over regional rivals Union Berlin. 

On 22 February 2020, Nkunku provided four assists in a 5–0 victory over Schalke 04. In doing so, he became just the second player in recent Bundesliga history to register four assists in a single match, after Szabolcs Huszti in 2012.

On 15 September 2021, Nkunku scored a hat-trick for Leipzig in their 6–3 defeat to Manchester City in a 2021–22 UEFA Champions League group stage match. He was the first player in the club's history to score a hat-trick in the Champions League. On 25 September 2021, Nkunku scored a brace in a 6–0 win against Hertha BSC. A week later, he scored another brace in a win against VfL Bochum, making this the first time he scored back-to-back braces in his career. In May 2022, he won the 2021–22 Bundesliga Player of the Season award after scoring 20 times and assisting 13 goals in 34 league games.

International career
Nkunku was born in France and is of Congolese descent. He was a French youth international, representing the country at under-16, under-19, under-20 and under-21 levels. He made three appearances for the under-20 team at the 2017 FIFA U-20 World Cup.

Nkunku was called up to the senior France squad for the first time for friendly matches against Ivory Coast and South Africa on 25 and 29 March 2022, respectively. He made his debut as a starter in the game against Ivory Coast. On 9 November 2022, he was named in the 25-man French squad for the 2022 FIFA World Cup in Qatar. On 15 November, he sustained a knee injury after colliding with Eduardo Camavinga during training at Clairefontaine, which forced him to drop out prior to the competition.

Career statistics

Club

International

Honours
Paris Saint-Germain
Ligue 1: 2015–16, 2017–18, 2018–19
Coupe de France: 2016–17, 2017–18
Coupe de la Ligue: 2016–17, 2017–18
Trophée des Champions: 2017, 2018

RB Leipzig
DFB-Pokal: 2021–22

Individual
Footballer of the Year in Germany: 2022 
Bundesliga Player of the Season: 2021–22
Bundesliga Team of the Season: 2021–22
VDV Bundesliga Player of the Season: 2021–22
VDV Bundesliga Team of the Season: 2021–22
Bundesliga Player of the Month: October 2021, February 2022, March 2022, April 2022
UEFA Europa League Team of the Season: 2021–22

References

External links

Profile at the RB Leipzig website

1997 births
Living people
People from Lagny-sur-Marne
Footballers from Seine-et-Marne
French footballers
Association football midfielders
Association football forwards
RCP Fontainebleau players
Paris Saint-Germain F.C. players
RB Leipzig players
Championnat National 2 players
Ligue 1 players
Bundesliga players
France international footballers
France youth international footballers
France under-21 international footballers
French expatriate footballers
Expatriate footballers in Germany
French expatriate sportspeople in Germany
Black French sportspeople
French sportspeople of Democratic Republic of the Congo descent